The Frenchman Formation is stratigraphic unit of Late Cretaceous (late Maastrichtian) age in the Western Canada Sedimentary Basin. It is present in southern Saskatchewan and the Cypress Hills of southeastern Alberta. The formation was defined by G.M. Furnival in 1942 from observations of outcrops along the Frenchman River, between Ravenscrag and Highway 37. It contains the youngest of dinosaur genera, much like the Hell Creek Formation in the United States.

Lithology

The Frenchman Formation consists of olive-green to brown, fine- to coarse-grained, cross-bedded sandstone with interbedded claystone bands and minor beds and lenses of intraformational clay-clast conglomerate. A conglomerate layer with well-rounded quartzite pebbles is present above the basal unconformity in some areas.

Thickness and distribution
The Frenchman Formation is present in southwestern Saskatchewan and the Cypress Hills area of southeastern Alberta. Its maximum reported thickness is about 113 m.

Age

The Frenchman Formation is of latest Maastrichtian age, and the top of the formation coincides with the Cretaceous-Paleogene boundary, as evidenced by biostratigraphic changes and, in some areas, the presence of the terminal Cretaceous iridium anomaly.

Relationship to other units

Although some early workers included the Frenchman Formation in the overlying Ravenscrag Formation, the two are separated by the Cretaceous-Paleogene boundary and are now treated separately. The contact is abrupt but conformable, and occurs at the base of the No. 1 or Ferris coal seam of the Ravenscrag Formation.

The Frenchman is separated from the underlying formations by an erosional unconformity, and depending on the depth of the erosion, the Frenchman rests on the Whitemud Formation, the Battle Formation, the Eastend Formation, or the Bearpaw Formation.  It is equivalent in age to the lower part of the Scollard Formation, the lower part of the Willow Creek Formation, the lower part of the Coalspur Formation in Alberta, and the Hell Creek Formation in Montana and North Dakota.

Paleontology

Mammals and birds

J.E. Storer described fossil mammals from the Gryde locality in the Frenchman Formation, including Parectypodus and Alphadon. A bone (the humeral end of the left coracoid) of a bird attributed to the genus Cimolopteryx has also been described from the Gryde locality.

Dinosaurs

See also

 List of dinosaur-bearing rock formations

References

Cretaceous Saskatchewan
Maastrichtian Stage of North America
Upper Cretaceous Series of North America
Western Canadian Sedimentary Basin
Stratigraphy of Saskatchewan